Taro Daniel was the defending champion but failed to defend his title, losing to Thiago Monteiro in the second round.

Radu Albot won the title after defeating Jan-Lennard Struff 6–3, 6–4 in the final.

Seeds

Draw

Finals

Top half

Bottom half

References
 Main Draw
 Qualifying Draw

Franken Challenge - Singles
2016 Singles